The  was a ship class of submarines of the Imperial Japanese Navy (IJN). There were four submarine designs of the Junsen type: J1, a modified J1, J2 and the J3.

Class variants
The Junsen type submarines were divided into four classes: 
 
 
 
 .

Junsen I (I-1 class)

Four boats were built in 1923-1929. Japan received six U-boats from Germany as reparations of World War I. The IJN copied , one of the six, producing the I-21-class minelayer submarine. The IJN could not find an optimal design of fleet submarine, so they and Kawasaki Heavy Industries sent many technical officers to the United Kingdom and Germany and got drawings of advanced submarines. The British L class became the Kaidai I, the K class became the Kaidai II and U-142 become Junsen I.

Junsen I Mod (I-5 class) 

This is a type which added a floatplane to the Junsen I.

Junsen II (I-6 class)  

Project number S32. This is a type which added a catapult to the Junsen I Mod. She was built in 1931 under the 1st Naval Armaments Supplement Programme (Maru 1).

Junsen III (I-7 class)

Project number S33. These boats combined the good points of the Junsen II and the Kaidai V. They were built in 1934 under the Maru 2 Programme. 
Junsen III became a 'typeship' for the Type-A, B and C.

Characteristics

Footnotes

Bibliography
, History of Pacific War Vol.17 I-Gō Submarines, Gakken (Japan), January 1998, 
Rekishi Gunzō, History of Pacific War Extra, "Perfect guide, The submarines of the Imperial Japanese Forces", Gakken (Japan), March 2005, 
Model Art Extra No.537, Drawings of Imperial Japanese Naval Vessels Part-3, Model Art Co. Ltd. (Japan), May 1999, Book code 08734-5
The Maru Special, Japanese Naval Vessels No.31 Japanese Submarines I, Ushio Shobō (Japan), September 1979, Book code 68343-31

External links

Submarine classes
 
Submarines of the Imperial Japanese Navy